The Veterans Against Terrorism (VAT) is a group of British military veterans. The movement in the United Kingdom opposes "Islamist extremists". The group is led by ex-soldier Richard Inman and reportedly has 8,500 members.

Background 
The group was formed in the aftermath of the Manchester Arena bombing, which claimed the lives of four from North East England. It said, "We are... vexed by the polarization of our great country by elements of the extreme right and the extreme left who are seeking to divide us further, we do not identify with any of these groups or any political party", however they did march with the Football Lads Alliance which has faced accusations of being a far-right movement, and in January 2018, it pledged their support to the UK Independence Party (UKIP) if Gerard Batten replaced Henry Bolton as leader.

References

External links 
 

2017 establishments in the United Kingdom
Political organizations established in 2017
Political movements in the United Kingdom

